Signe Eleonora Cecilia Hasso (née Larsson; 15 August 1915 – 7 June 2002) was a Swedish actress, writer, and composer.

Biography
Hasso was born in the Kungsholmen parish of Stockholm, Sweden in 1915. Her father and grandfather died when she was four, and  her mother, grandmother, two siblings, and she shared a single room. Her mother, a former aspiring actress herself, worked as a waffle cook.

Her acting career began by accident. When a young actress fell ill, her mother was asked if she knew of any little girl who could act. Signe Hasso later recalled, "I was 12 then and didn't want to go and neither did my sister, so my mother flipped a coin. I lost." Her audition for a Molière play was successful, and she started earning money as an actress. She performed in Royal Dramatic Theatre productions, beginning in 1927 at the age of 12, and enrolled as the youngest acting student in its history at the age of 16.

She performed on stage and in film in Sweden. In 1933, Signe Larrson made her first film, Tystnadens hus, with German film director/cameraman Harry Hasso, whom she married the same year. They had a son by the time she was 19. They divorced in 1942. In Sweden, Signe was approached by Hollywood's Howard Hughes to move to the United States, where she would sign a contract with RKO Pictures (which he would later control), who promoted her as "the next Garbo". 

With only a few RKO roles forthcoming, she turned to the stage to make a living. According to the Internet Broadway Database, she appeared in five Broadway productions, beginning with Golden Wings (1941). In the mid-1940s, she signed with Metro-Goldwyn-Mayer. Her first role of note was in Heaven Can Wait (1943). During the 1940s, she appeared in The Seventh Cross (1944), Johnny Angel (1945), The House on 92nd Street (1945), A Scandal in Paris (1946), and A Double Life (1947). Her favorite role was as the ex-wife of an actor driven mad, played by Ronald Colman, in A Double Life.

By the 1950s, her Hollywood career had stalled. Instead of Hollywood, Signe was asked to join Eva Le Galliene's American Repertory Company, ARC. 

In 1957, her son was killed in a motor-cycle accident on Santa Monica Boulevard.

Signe was a frequent television guest on Bob Hope's NBC TV (Burbank) prime-time series.  In the seventies Signe relocated to Park La Brea where Signe remained until her death..

From then on, she divided her time between making films in Sweden and acting on stage in New York City until she returned to Hollywood in the 1960s. She also acted on television, making guest appearances in several popular TV series, including Route 66, Bonanza, The Outer Limits, The Green Hornet,  Cannon, Starsky and Hutch, The Streets of San Francisco, Ellery Queen, Quincy, M.E., Magnum, P.I., Trapper John, M.D., and Hart to Hart.

Hasso composed music, as a lyricist, songwriter and author, as well, translator, she translated Swedish folk songs into English. Her debut novel, Momo (1977), depicts her childhood in interwar Stockholm. Hasso's second album, Where the Sun Meets the Moon (1979), consists of her own versions of Swedish folk tunes. In a 1995 interview, she stated she wanted to be remembered for her writing, not her acting. She continued to act until late in her life, her last film being One Hell of a Guy (1998).

Death
She died at Cedars-Sinai Medical Center, Los Angeles, California in 2002, aged 86, of pneumonia and cancer. Hasso adhered to Lutheranism.

Awards
In 1935, she received the Theatre League's De Wahl-stipendium and in 1939 the first Nordic nordiska Gösta Ekmanpriset. In 1972, King Gustaf VI Adolf of Sweden named her Member 1st Class of the Royal Order of Vasa. In 1989, the Vasa Order of America named her Swedish-American of the Year. Hasso has a star on the Hollywood Walk of Fame for her contribution to motion pictures, at 7080 Hollywood Boulevard.

Selected bibliography
 Momo (1977)
 Kom slott (1978)
 Inte än (1988)
 Om igen (1989)
 Tidens vän (1990)

Complete filmography

 Tystnadens hus (House of Silence, 1933) - Susanna Braun
 Witches' Night (1937) - Majken Celsing
 Career (1938) - Monika Hall
 Geld fällt vom Himmel (1938) - Hannelore
 Pengar från skyn (1938) - Hanne
 The Two of Us (1939) - Kristina - hans hustru
 Emilie Högquist (1939) - Emelie Högqvist
 Bastard (1940) - Aitanga, nomadepike
 Stål (1940) - Margit
 Än en gång Gösta Ekman (1940 short) - Birgit Steen
 With Open Arms (1940) - Eva Richert
 The Three of Us (1940) - Kristina, hans hustru
 Den ljusnande framtid (Bright Prospects, 1941) - Birgit Norén
 Assignment in Brittany (1943) - Elise
 Heaven Can Wait (1943) - Mademoiselle
 The Story of Dr. Wassell (1944) - Bettina
 The Seventh Cross (1944) - Toni
 Dangerous Partners (1945) - Carola Ballister
 The House on 92nd Street (1945) - Elsa Gebhardt
 Johnny Angel (1945) - Paulette Girard
 Strange Triangle (1946) - Francine Huber
 A Scandal in Paris (1946) - Therese De Pierremont
 Where There's Life (1947) - Gen. Katrina Grimovitch
 A Double Life (1947) - Brita Kaurin
 To the Ends of the Earth (1948) - Ann Grant
 Outside the Wall (1950) - Celia Bentner
 Crisis (1950) - Senora Isabel Farrago
 This Can't Happen Here (1950) - Vera Irmelin
 Hans Christian Andersen Fairy Tales (1952 short)
 The Sun of St. Moritz (1954) - Gerti Selle
Taxi 13 (1954) - Agneta
 The Magnificent Lie (1955) - Joséphine de Merret
 Picture Mommy Dead (1966) - Sister René
 Code Name: Heraclitus (1967 TV movie) - Lydia Constantine
 A Reflection of Fear (1972) - Julia
 Shell Game (1975 TV movie) - Countess
 The Black Bird (1975) - Dr. Crippen
 Sherlock Holmes in New York (1976 TV movie) - Fraulein Reichenbach
 I Never Promised You a Rose Garden (1977) - Helene
 Winner Take All (1977 TV movie)
 Evita Peron (1981 TV movie) - Fedora
 Pappa är död (1982 TV movie) - Sonja Bengtsson
 Mirrors (1985 TV movie) - Madame Eugenia
 One Hell of a Guy (1998) - Aunt Vivian

References

Further reading

External links

 
 
 
 

1915 births
2002 deaths
Actresses from Stockholm
American Lutherans
American film actresses
American stage actresses
American television actresses
Deaths from cancer in California
Deaths from pneumonia in California
Knights First Class of the Order of Vasa
Swedish emigrants to the United States
Swedish film actresses
Swedish stage actresses
Swedish Lutherans
Burials at Norra begravningsplatsen
20th-century American actresses
20th-century Lutherans
20th-century Swedish women